Amazigh Kateb (born September 16, 1972) is an Algerian singer and musician.

Early life
He emigrated to France in Grenoble in 1988, he was a member of the group Gnawa Diffusion (formed in 1992). He is the son of the famous writer Kateb Yacine, founder of the modern Algerian literature (Nedjma, the circle of reprisals ...).  Amazigh also claims Africanism and the mixture of cultures of the Algeria which is neither white nor black. Amazigh Kateb left the band from its beginnings to launch a solo career since 2007, to devote himself more to his personal projects.

He announced the release of his first album for October 17, 2009. From 2005 to 2010 he participated in the musical documentary Tagnawittude made by Benhamou Rahma El Madani.

Discography 

 1993: [Légitime différence]
 1997: [Algeria] (Melodie)
 1999: [Bab el Oued – Kingston] (Musisoft)[2]
 2002: [DZ Live] (Next Musique)
 2003: [Souk System] (Warner)
 2007: [Fucking Cowboys] (D'JAMAZ Production)
 2009: [Marchez noir]

References

External links 
  Official Website
  Entretient avec Amazigh
  Interview avec Amazigh

1972 births
Living people
Algerian emigrants to France
Wrasse Records artists
Musicians from Algiers
Chaoui people
Berber musicians
20th-century Algerian  male singers
21st-century Algerian  male  singers
Musicians from Grenoble